This is a list of Canadian films which were released in 1995:

See also
 1995 in Canada
 1995 in Canadian television

External links
Feature Films Released In 1995 With Country of Origin Canada at IMDb

1995
1995 in Canadian cinema
Canada